Gaetano Ungaro (born September 21, 1987) is an Italian former professional football player.

Club career
He played one game in the Serie A in the 2005–06 season for Reggina.

On 29 August 2018 he joined Serie D club  Castrovillari.

On 6 August 2019 he signed with Messina.

Post-playing career
On 15 July 2021 he returned to Reggina once again, now in Serie B, in a technical supporting role.

Personal life
He is currently married to the daughter of Reggina owner Pasquale Foti, and in 2015 they gave birth to their first child.

References

External links
 
 

1987 births
Living people
Italian footballers
Sportspeople from Reggio Calabria
Serie A players
Serie C players
Serie D players
Reggina 1914 players
Taranto F.C. 1927 players
A.C. Perugia Calcio players
Ravenna F.C. players
Cosenza Calcio players
A.S. Melfi players
Potenza Calcio players
Association football defenders
U.S. Castrovillari Calcio players
Footballers from Calabria